Richard Robert McNulty was a former United States Navy rear admiral and a former United States Maritime Service vice admiral, was born in Gloucester, Massachusetts, on April 20, 1899, and died in Boston, Massachusetts, on November 1, 1980. The United States Merchant Marine Academy community considers Vice Admiral McNulty, a World War II veteran, who had long advocated for the academy's creation, its "Father". The academy's McNulty Campus is named for the vice admiral. He served as the academy's 3rd superintendent. Vice Admiral McNulty was, too, a professor emeritus at Georgetown University.

Career
McNulty served as a Merchant marine officer from 1917 to 1920. Beginning as a nautical specialist, he served with the U.S. Dept. of Navy from 1920 to 1937. McNulty was supervisor of the U.S. Merchant Marine Cadet Corps of the United States Maritime Commission from 1938 to 1948. He was on active duty in the U.S. Navy during World War II from 1942 until 1946, attaining the rank of commodore. In 1946, McNulty was appointed the 3rd superintendent of the U.S. Merchant Marine Academy at Kings Point, New York, the latest of the five United States Service academies and an institution for which McNulty had advocated since the late 1920s. He served as the academy's superintendent until his retirement from the military in 1948. McNulty was a member of the Society of Naval Architects and Engineers.

Education
Richard Robert McNulty graduated from the Massachusetts Nautical School (1919). He received a B.S. from the School of Foreign Service at Georgetown University (1922).

Major military decorations
 Order of Naval Merit (Cuba) (1939) 
 Legion of Merit (1946)

Other honors
Georgetown University's McNulty Foreign Service Scholarship (established 1945) is named for Vice Admiral McNulty.
The Vice Admiral Richard R. McNulty Award is among the awards bestowed annually upon members of the USMMA graduating class.

References

External links
 
  USMMA

1899 births
1980 deaths
People from Gloucester, Massachusetts
United States Navy admirals
Recipients of the Legion of Merit
United States Navy personnel of World War II
Burials at Arlington National Cemetery
Walsh School of Foreign Service alumni
Georgetown University faculty
United States Merchant Marine Academy superintendents
Military personnel from Massachusetts
20th-century American academics